Cover Your Tracks may refer to:

Cover Your Tracks (band) American metalcore band from Atlanta, Georgia.
Cover Your Tracks (album), by Bury Your Dead 2004
Cover Your Tracks, compilation album by Deep Elm Records 2007
Cover Your Tracks, EP Young Galaxy 
"Cover Your Tracks", song from Shapeshifting (Young Galaxy album)
"Cover Your Tracks", song by A Boy and His Kite from The Twilight Saga: Breaking Dawn – Part 2 (soundtrack)